Wenches jul is a 1991 Christmas album by Wenche Myhre. It was rereleased in 2003.

In 1992, a Swedish-language version of the album was also recorded.

Track listing

Side A
 Christmas medley (3:09)
 Hei, hå, nå er det jul igjen
 Bjelleklang (Jingle Bells)
 Jeg så mamma kysse nissen (I Saw Mommy Kissing Santa Claus)
 Snømannen Kalle (Frosty the Snowman)
 Eventyrland / Sledeturen (2:45)
 Julenissen tror jeg på (I Believe in Santa Claus) (3:23), duet with Christer Sjögren
 Min barndoms hvite jul (3:36)
 Her kommer nissefar (1:56)

Side B
 Det største vi kan få (3:40), duett med Tor Endresen
 Julenissen kommer i kveld (Santa Claus is Coming to Town) (1:47), guitar solo by Pete Knutsen
 Et lys imot mørketida (3:17)
 Varm sjokolade (0:14), med Fam Myhre-Broberg
 Kom til Vinterland (2:12), duett med Fam Myhre-Broberg
 Stjernen i det blå (3:51)
 Den fineste dagen på jord (4:09)
 La det snø, la det snø, la det snø (Let It Snow) (2:15), trombone solo Frode Thingnæs
 Alt jeg ønsker til den søte julefest (0:50), med Edvard Askeland (kontrabass) & Frode Thingnæs (trombone)

Chart positions

References

Wenche Myhre albums
1991 Christmas albums
Christmas albums by Norwegian artists
Schlager Christmas albums